Adulis serratalis is a species of snout moth. It was described by Émile Louis Ragonot in 1891 and is found in the Gambia.

References

Moths described in 1891
Pyralinae
Moths of Africa
Taxa named by Émile Louis Ragonot